Knowle and Dorridge Cricket Club is an amateur cricket club in Knowle, near Solihull in Warwickshire. They play their home games at Station Road in Knowle. The club's 1st XI currently play in the Birmingham and District Premier League.

Roll of Honour
1998 Division One 1st XI Runners-Up
1998 Division One 2nd XI Runners-Up
1999 Division One 2nd XI Champions
2000 Division One 1st XI Champions
2001 1st XI Challenge Cup Champions
2003 Premier Division 2nd XI Runners-Up
2005 1st XI Challenge Cup Champions
2007 Premier Division 1st XI runners-Up
2007 Graham Williamson Trophy Runners-Up
2009 Premier Division 1st XI Champions
2017 Premier Division 1st XI Champions

Leading run scorers (1982-2021) 
Kevin Bray - 9008 runs (243 innings)
Alex Phillips - 6083 (164)
Sam Reddish - 4346 (176)
 Daniel Dalton - 4259 (141)
Nigel Moore - 3845 (180)
Tom Jameson - 3227 (140)
Ian Maddocks - 3055 (149)

Leading wicket takers (1982-2021) 
Kevin Bray - 393 @ 15
Will Mottram - 385 @ 22
Jamie Spires - 327 @ 21
Nigel Moore - 314 @ 21
Ben Coley - 308 @21
Chris Davidson - 290 @20
Jack Grundy - 278 @ 20
Tom Jameson - 236 @ 23
Darren Altree - 208 @ 16

International players
Allan Donald
Gladstone Small
David Hemp
Dougie Brown
Travis Friend
Jan-Berrie Burger
Ryan McLaren
George Worker
Ian Bell

External links
Official site

English club cricket teams